Tabiona is a town in Duchesne County, Utah, United States. It is eighty-six miles southeast of the Salt Lake City metropolitan area. The population was 171 at the 2010 United States Census.

History
Tabiona was named for  a Shoshone chief, Chief Tabby-To-Kwanah.

http://www.blackhawkproductions.com/facts.htm

Education
Because of its small population, Tabiona houses all 12 grades in the same building. Classrooms serve students from kindergarten through 12th grade, though grade school students attend classes in a separate wing of the school building.
Tabiona High competes as a 1A school in athletics and the school mascot is the Tiger. The school colors are purple and white. Tabiona has a rich tradition in basketball. Both the boys' and girls' teams have enjoyed success under coach Lee Gines winning region and state titles. Tabiona was crowned 1A champion in girls basketball in 2007 and won its most recent 1A titles in boys basketball in 1997 and 1999.
Tabiona also competes in sports such as girls volleyball and baseball. Student numbers are too low to field teams in other popular sports such as football and soccer.

Recreation

The Tabiona–Hanna area is a well renowned mule deer hunting spot. Every fall hunters flock to this Northeast region of Utah to try to score trophy bucks. Many families continue the tradition of deer hunting in the area and have done so with much success. Recently many private landowners in the area have begun restricting hunters from shooting game in their fields. Also, Ute Indian tribal lands are off limits during the hunt. Elk hunting and fishing are also very popular pastimes in the area.

Religion
The dominant religion in Tabiona is the Church of Jesus Christ of Latter-day Saints. The local church building is about half a block from the high school.

Geography

Demographics
As of the census of 2000, there were 149 people, 50 households, and 38 families residing in the town. The population density was 1,148.7 people per square mile (442.5/km). There were 68 housing units at an average density of 524.2 per square mile (202.0/km). The racial makeup of the town was 97.99% White, 0.67% Native American, 0.67% Pacific Islander, and 0.67% from two or more races. Hispanic or Latino of any race were 2.01% of the population.

There were 50 households, out of which 42.0% had children under the age of 18 living with them, 64.0% were married couples living together, 10.0% had a female householder with no husband present, and 24.0% were non-families. 24.0% of all households were made up of individuals, and 18.0% had someone living alone who was 65 years of age or older. The average household size was 2.98 and the average family size was 3.53.

In the town, the population was spread out, with 37.6% under the age of 18, 7.4% from 18 to 24, 20.8% from 25 to 44, 19.5% from 45 to 64, and 14.8% who were 65 years of age or older. The median age was 34 years. For every 100 females, there were 106.9 males. For every 100 females age 18 and over, there were 89.8 males.

The median income for a household in the town was $28,750, and the median income for a family was $27,344. Males had a median income of $30,938 versus $7,083 for females. The per capita income for the town was $8,667. There were 27.7% of families and 41.9% of the population living below the poverty line, including 58.8% of under eighteens and 45.5% of those over 64.

See also

 List of cities and towns in Utah

References

External links

Towns in Duchesne County, Utah
Towns in Utah
Populated places established in 1860